A wheel is a circular device that is capable of rotating on an axle.

Wheel may also refer to:

Machinery
Ferris wheel
Breaking wheel, a medieval execution device
English wheel, a metalworking tool used to curve sheet metal
Hamster wheel, an exercise toy used by pet rodents
Water wheel, a wheel for converting the energy of flowing or falling water
Steering wheel, for steering land vehicles
Ship's wheel, for steering water vessels
Rim (wheel), the periphery or outside edge of a wheel
Bicycle
Alloy wheel, a type of automobile wheel
Artillery wheel, a type of wheel most recently used on American cars
Steel wheel
Train wheel
Wagon wheel
Wheel and axle, a simple machine that translates torque or force applied at one radius to a different force or torque at a different radius
Wire wheel

Science and technology 
 Wheel (algebra), an algebra in which division by zero is possible
 Wheel (computing), in computing, a user group that provides additional special system privileges
 Prayer wheel (slide rule), a circular slide rule
 Wheel (Python), a "setuptools" package format extension replacing "egg" package format
 Wheel graph, a mathematical concept

Geography
Wheel, Kentucky, U.S.
Wheel, Tennessee, U.S.

Religion
Wheel of Law or Wheel of Dharma, a symbol that has represented dharma, the Buddha's teaching of the path to enlightenment
 In the Judeo-Christian tradition, the following classes of celestial beings:
Throne (angel)
Ophanim
 Prayer wheel, a cylindrical wheel on a spindle

Film and television
La Roue (The Wheel), a 1923 French film
The Wheel (1925 film)
The Wheel (game show), a British television game show created and hosted by Michael McIntyre
"The Wheel", a wheel in the game show Wheel of Fortune
"The Wheel" (Law & Order), a 2002 episode of Law & Order
"The Wheel" (Mad Men), an episode of Mad Men
The Wheel, a 1983 production by the Theatre New Brunswick
Das Rad (The Wheel), a 2001 animated short
The Wheel (2021 film)

Music
"The Wheel", the nickname of guitarist Radomir Mihailović
Wheel (album), a 2013 album by Laura Stevenson
The Wheel (band), Australian country music band.
 The Wheel (Asleep at the Wheel album), a 1977 album by Asleep at the Wheel
 The Wheel (Rosanne Cash album), a 1993 album by Rosanne Cash
The Wheel, 2003 album by David Olney

Songs
"The Wheel", a song by Bill Black's Combo, 1960
"The Wheel", a song by The Breakaways Australia, 1964
"The Wheel", a song by Bert Jansch from Lucky Thirteen (Bert Jansch album), 1966
"The Wheel", a song and single by Jerry Garcia, Robert Hunter, and Bill Kreutzmann from the 1972 album Garcia
"The Wheel", a song and single by Spear Of Destiny from Grapes of Wrath (album), 1983
"The Wheel", a song by Edie Brickell & New Bohemians from Shooting Rubberbands at the Stars, 1988 
"The Wheel", a song by Rosanne Cash from album of the same name, 1993
"The Wheel" (song), a song by PJ Harvey, 2016

"The Wheel", a song by Australian psychedelic rock band King Gizzard & the Lizard Wizard, the closing track to their 2017 album Gumboot Soup

Other
Agricultural Wheel, an alliance of farmers in Arkansas
The Wheel, a short story by John Wyndham, published in the collection Jizzle
 An ace-to-five straight, a type of poker hand
The Wheel (charity), a charity support association in Ireland
Wheel (detergent), a brand of laundry detergent
Wheel (route), a pattern run by a receiver or running back in American football

People with the surname
Geoff Wheel (born 1951), Welsh rugby union player

See also
Wheels (disambiguation)
Wheeling (disambiguation)
Wheelhouse (disambiguation)
Wheal (disambiguation)